Hallowed Ground may refer to:

 Hallowed ground, ground which has been hallowed, or consecrated
 Cemetery which has been consecrated

Music
Hallowed Ground (Violent Femmes album) or the title track
Hallowed Ground (Skin Yard album) or the title track
“Hallowed Ground”, by the Alarm from Eye of the Hurricane
“Hallowed Ground”, by Erasure from The Innocents
“Hallowed Ground”, by Jude Cole from A View from 3rd Street
“Hallowed Ground”, by W.A.S.P. from Dying for the World
“Hallowed Ground”, by Biohazard from Kill or Be Killed
“Hallowed Ground”, by How to Destroy Angels from Welcome Oblivion

Other uses
Hallowed Ground (film), a 2007 horror film directed by David Benullo
Hallowed Ground (magazine), a magazine published by the American Battlefield Trust
 In Hocus Pocus (1993 film), Thackeray Binks says witches cannot set foot on hollow ground and takes Thora Birch to a cemetery.

See also

 On Hallowed Ground (book) AD&D RPG manual
 Unhallowed Ground (disambiguation)
 Hallow (disambiguation)